Carl Theodore Liebermann (23 February 1842 – 28 December 1914) was a German chemist and student of Adolf von Baeyer.

Life 
Liebermann first studied at the University of Heidelberg where Robert Wilhelm Bunsen was teaching. He then joined the group of Adolf von Baeyer at the University of Berlin where he received his PhD in 1865.

Together with Carl Gräbe, Liebermann synthesised the orange-red dye alizarin in 1868. After his habilitation in 1870 he became professor at the University of Berlin after Adolf von Baeyer left for the University of Strasbourg. Shortly after Liebermann retired, in 1914, he died.

Work 

In 1826, the French chemist Pierre Jean Robiquet had isolated from the root of a plant, madder, and defined the structure of, alizarin, a remarkable red dye. Liebermann's 1868 discovery that alizarin can be reduced to form anthracene, which is an abundant component in coal tar, opened the road for synthetic alizarin. The patent of Liebermann and Carl Gräbe for the synthesis of alizarin from anthracene was filed one day before the patent of William Henry Perkin. The synthesis is a chlorination or bromination of anthracene with a subsequent oxidation forming the alizarin.

See also 
 Pierre Jean Robiquet
 Carl Gräbe
 William Henry Perkin

References 

1842 births
1914 deaths
19th-century German chemists
19th-century German Jews
20th-century German chemists
Jewish chemists
Academic staff of the Humboldt University of Berlin
Members of the Royal Society of Sciences in Uppsala